Trichosea ainu is a moth of the family Noctuidae. It is endemic to Japan.

The wingspan is about 40 mm.

External links
 Listing of the collection of Siberian Zoological Museum
 Japanese moths

Pantheinae
Moths of Japan
Moths described in 1911